Movie Digest Show was Uganda's first movie review television program that aired every Tuesday at 8:30 pm. The first season of the program originally aired on Record TV Network. The second premiered July 2013.

Hosts 

Actresses Monica Birwinyo and Irene Asumpta and former Tusker Project Fame 3 contestant Jacob Nsaali  were the original hosts of the show from March 4, 2012 until December 10, 2012 on Record TV. It was announced that screenwriter and film director Usama Mukwaya would replace Jacob in May 2013 with the second season airing soon.

See also
Hand in Hand (Ugandan TV series)
Beneath The Lies - The Series

External links

References 

Ugandan television series
English-language television shows
2012 Ugandan television series debuts
2010s Ugandan television series